"Stargazer" is a song by Canadian rock band The Tea Party. It was released as a promotional single in Canada. The music video was shot in Toronto. It is a performance-style video shot with bluescreen imagery used with the intention of reflecting the grandiosity of the song.

"Stargazer" is a three-piece rock song which Jeff Burrows called "a good advertisement for the band".

References

External links
 The music video

2004 singles
The Tea Party songs
Song recordings produced by Gavin Brown (musician)
2004 songs
EMI Records singles